Ambrogio Brambilla (active 1579–1599) was an Italian engraver and cartographer, mainly active in Rome.

Biography
Ambrogio was born in Milan, but by 1579 he is listed as a member of the Congregazione dei Virtuosi al Pantheon, a guild of artists, and he remained there at least until 1599. In 1582 Brambilla produced a series of 135 small engravings of the emperors from Julius Caesar to Rudolf II and in 1585, another series, of the popes up to Sixtus V.

His most successful works, however, were prints of scenographic reconstructions of antiquity such as the Sepulchre of Lucius Septimius known as the Septizodium (1582) and contemporary Vedute of ancient and modern Rome, for example, the Belvedere of the Vatican (1579), the Tomb of Julius II by Michelangelo, and the Girandola di fuochi artificiali a Castel Sant'angelo (Fireworks Display at Castel Sant'Angelo) (1579).

Many of his prints depicting ancient monuments, produced after 1577, were included in the volume titled Speculum Romanae magnificentiae (The Mirror of Roman Magnificence) produced a la carte for buyers interested in views of the monuments of Rome, published by establishment of Antonio Salamanca and Antonio Lafreri.

He also produced prints depicting popular games and street scenes. In 1589 he engraved the Last Judgement after a relief sculpture in wax on slate by Giacomo Vivio based on Michelangelo's painting in the Sistine Chapel, Rome. Two unpublished engravings depict a Perspective Map of Ancona'' (1585) and a View of the Catafalque for the Funeral of Cardinal Alessandro Farnese (1589; both Milan, Castello Sforzesco). Later sources record Brambilla's activity as a poet, sculptor in bronze, painter and architect.

References

Year of birth unknown
Year of death unknown
Painters from Rome
Italian engravers
16th-century Italian painters
Italian male painters